In mathematics, and particularly in category theory, a polygraph is a generalisation of a directed graph.  It is also known as a computad.  They were introduced as "polygraphs" by Albert Burroni and as "computads" by Ross Street.

In the same way that a directed multigraph can freely generate a category, an n-computad is the "most general" structure which can generate a free n-category.

References 

Category theory
Directed graphs